Nitro World Games 2016 was an action sports competition by Nitro Circus that took place on July 16, 2016, at the Rice-Eccles Stadium in Salt Lake City, Utah. This was the inaugural edition of the Nitro World Games.

The games were broadcast live through social media platforms.

Results

Medal count

Podium details

References

External links
Website

2016 in sports in Utah
2016 in multi-sport events
2016 in motorcycle sport